Bangkok Arena of Bangkok Mall, known as Bangkok Arena, is a planned indoor multi-purpose sports arena within the Bangkok Mall complex, in Bang Na, Bangkok, Thailand. It will be the largest indoor arenas in Thailand. It will have a seating capacity of 12,000 for entertainment and sport events.
The Arena will open in the first quarter of 2023. It is owned by The Mall Group and operated by the Anschutz Entertainment Group.

See also 
Em Live

References 

Proposed indoor arenas
Buildings and structures in Bangkok
Indoor arenas in Thailand
Sports venues in Bangkok
Indoor arenas under construction
Proposed buildings and structures in Thailand
The Mall Group